In physics, a gauge principle specifies a procedure for obtaining an interaction term from a free Lagrangian which is symmetric with respect to a continuous symmetry—the results of localizing (or gauging) the global symmetry group must be accompanied by the inclusion of additional fields (such as the electromagnetic field), with appropriate kinetic and interaction terms in the action, in such a way that the extended Lagrangian is covariant with respect to a new extended group of local transformations.

See also
Gauge theory
Gauge covariant derivative
Gauge fixing
Gauge gravitation theory
Kaluza–Klein theory
Lie algebra
Lie group
Lorenz gauge
Quantum chromodynamics
Quantum electrodynamics
Quantum field theory
Quantum gauge theory
Standard Model
Standard Model (mathematical formulation)
Symmetry breaking
Symmetry in physics
Yang–Mills theory
Yang–Mills existence and mass gap
1964 PRL symmetry breaking papers

References

Gauge theories
Theoretical physics